Donna Reed (born Donna Belle Mullenger; January 27, 1921 – January 14, 1986) was an American actress. Her career spanned more than 40 years, with performances in more than 40 films. She is well known for her portrayal of Mary Hatch Bailey in Frank Capra's fantasy holiday film It's a Wonderful Life (1946). Reed won the Academy Award for Best Supporting Actress for Fred Zinnemann's war drama film From Here to Eternity (1953).

Reed is known for her work in television, notably as Donna Stone, a middle-class American mother and housewife in the sitcom The Donna Reed Show (1958–1966) whose character was more assertive and complex than most other television mothers of the era. She received numerous Emmy Award nominations for this role and the Golden Globe Award for Best TV Star in 1963. Later in her career, Reed replaced Barbara Bel Geddes as Miss Ellie Ewing Farlow in the 1984–1985 season of the television melodrama Dallas; she successfully sued the production company for breach of contract when she was abruptly fired upon Bel Geddes' decision to return to the show.

Early life 
Reed was born Donna Belle Mullenger on January 27, 1921, on a farm near Denison, Iowa, the daughter of Hazel Jane (née Shives) and William Richard Mullenger. The eldest of five children, she was raised as a Methodist. In 1936, while she was a sophomore at Denison (Iowa) High School, her chemistry teacher Edward Tompkins gave her the book How to Win Friends and Influence People. The book is said to have greatly influenced her life. Upon reading it she won the lead in the school play, was voted Campus Queen and was in the top 10 of the 1938 graduating class. Tompkins went on to work on the Manhattan Project.

After graduating from Denison High School, Reed planned to become a teacher but was unable to pay for college. She decided to move to California to attend Los Angeles City College on the advice of her aunt. While attending college, she performed in various stage productions, although she had no plans to become an actress. After receiving several offers to screen test for studios, Reed eventually signed with Metro-Goldwyn-Mayer; however, she insisted on finishing her education first. She completed her associate degree, then signed with an agent.

Career

MGM

In 1941 after signing with Metro-Goldwyn-Mayer, Reed made her film debut in The Get-Away opposite Robert Sterling; she was billed as Donna Adams.

MGM soon changed her name to Donna Reed, as there was anti-German feeling during World War II. "A studio publicist hung the name on me, and I never did like it", Reed once said. "I hear 'Donna Reed' and I think of a tall, chic, austere blonde that isn't me. 'Donna Reed' – it has a cold, forbidding sound."

Reed had a supporting role in Shadow of the Thin Man (1941) and in Wallace Beery's The Bugle Sounds (1942). Like many starlets at MGM, she played opposite Mickey Rooney in an Andy Hardy film, in her case the hugely popular The Courtship of Andy Hardy (1942). She was second billed in a children's film, Mokey (1942). Reed starred in Calling Dr. Gillespie (1942) and Apache Trail (1942), then did a thriller with Edward Arnold, Eyes in the Night (1942), directed by Fred Zinnemann.

Reed had a support role in The Human Comedy (1943) with Mickey Rooney, a big film for MGM. She was in Dr. Gillespie's Criminal Case (1943) and The Man from Down Under (1943), and was one of many MGM stars to make cameos in Thousands Cheer (1943). Her "girl-next-door" good looks and warm onstage personality made her a popular pin-up for many GIs during World War II. She personally answered letters from many GIs serving overseas. Reed starred in See Here, Private Hargrove (1944) and Gentle Annie (1945), a Western. She was in The Picture of Dorian Gray (1945) and played a nurse in John Ford's They Were Expendable (1945), opposite John Wayne. MGM was very enthusiastic about Reed's prospects at this time.

Reed collaborated with her Denison High school chemistry teacher Edward R. Tompkins (who, as noted earlier, worked on the Manhattan Project) on the 1947 MGM film The Beginning or the End, which dealt with the history and concerns of the atom bomb. Reed helped provide the story but did not appear in the final film. Reed was top billed in a romantic comedy Faithful in My Fashion (1946) with Tom Drake which lost money.

MGM lent her to RKO Pictures for the role of Mary Bailey in Frank Capra's It's a Wonderful Life.  The film has since been named as one of the 100 best American films ever made by the American Film Institute and is regularly aired on television during the Christmas season. Reed later said it was "the most difficult film I ever did. No director ever demanded as much of me."

Back at MGM she appeared in Green Dolphin Street (1947) with Lana Turner and Van Heflin, a big hit.

Reed was borrowed by Paramount to make two films with Alan Ladd, Beyond Glory (1948), where she replaced Joan Caulfield at the last moment, and Chicago Deadline (1949). In 1949 she expressed a desire for better roles.

Columbia

In June 1950 Reed signed a contract with Columbia Studios. She appeared in two films which teamed her with John Derek, Saturday's Hero (1951) and Scandal Sheet (1952). She had a cameo in Rainbow 'Round My Shoulder (1952).

Reed was the love interest of Randolph Scott in Hangman's Knot (1952), then was borrowed by Warner Bros for Trouble Along the Way (1953) with Wayne. She was loaned out to play John Payne's love interest in Edward Small's Raiders of the Seven Seas (1953).

Reed played the role of Alma "Lorene" Burke, girlfriend of Montgomery Clift's character, in the World War II drama From Here to Eternity (1953). The role earned Reed an Academy Award for Best Supporting Actress for 1953.

The qualities of her parts did not seem to improve: she was the love interest in The Caddy (1953) with Martin and Lewis at Paramount; Gun Fury (1953) with Rock Hudson; Three Hours to Kill (1954) with Dana Andrews; and They Rode West (1954) with Robert Francis. Reed returned to MGM to act in The Last Time I Saw Paris (1954).

Reed began guest starring on television shows such as The Ford Television Theatre, Tales of Hans Anderson, General Electric Theater and Suspicion.

She continued to appear in features, usually as the love interest, in The Far Horizons (1955) at Pine-Thomas Productions with Fred MacMurray and Charlton Heston as Lewis and Clark, playing Native American Sacagawea; The Benny Goodman Story (1956) with Steve Allen at Universal, playing Goodman's wife; Ransom! (1956) at MGM as Glenn Ford's wife; Backlash (1956), a Western at Universal with Richard Widmark; Beyond Mombasa (1957), shot in Kenya with Cornel Wilde, during which she was injured while making the film; and The Whole Truth (1958), shot in England with Stewart Granger for Romulus Pictures.

The Donna Reed Show 
From 1958 to 1966, Reed starred in The Donna Reed Show, a television series produced by her then-husband, Tony Owen. The show featured her as Donna Stone, the wife of pediatrician Alex Stone (Carl Betz) and mother of Jeff (Paul Petersen) and Mary Stone (Shelley Fabares). Reed was attracted to the idea of being in a comedy, something with which she did not have much experience. She also liked playing a wife.

The show ran for eight seasons on ABC. Reed won a Golden Globe Award and earned four Emmy Award nominations for her work on the series.

Reed described her show as "[...] a realistic picture of small-town life with an often humorous twist. Our plots revolve around the most important thing in America—a loving family." In the show, Reed's character, Donna Stone, is a loving mother and wife, but also a strong, smart woman with feelings and a sense of humor.

But some feminists criticized the show, asserting that it promoted submissiveness among housewives. In a 1979 interview, Reed, who had raised four children, responded, "I played a strong woman who could manage her family. That was offensive to a lot of people."

In a 1984 television interview, Reed said of her show, "I felt that I was making, for women, a statement. This mother was not stupid. She wasn't domineering, but she was bright and I thought rather forward-thinking, happily married."

In a 2008 interview, Paul Petersen, who portrayed her son Jeff Stone in the series, also shared his opinions about the production's significance:
That's what the show was really about, the importance of family. That's where life's lessons are transmitted, generation to generation. There's a certain way in which these are transmitted, with love and affection...[The Donna Reed Show] depicts a better time and place. It has a sort of level of intelligence and professionalism that is sadly lacking in current entertainment products. The messages it sent out were positive and uplifting. The folks you saw were likable, the family was fun, the situations were familiar to people. It provided 22-and-a-half-minutes of moral instruction and advice on how to deal with the little dilemmas of life.

Later career

When The Donna Reed Show ended its run in 1966, Reed took time off from acting to concentrate on raising her children and engaging in political activism. She returned to acting in the late '70s, appearing in the TV movies The Best Place to Be (1979) and Deadly Lessons (1983) and a guest stint on The Love Boat.

In the 1984–85 season of the television series Dallas, Reed replaced Barbara Bel Geddes as Miss Ellie Ewing. Of the show, Reed explained in a 1984 interview,
One of the main reasons Dallas is successful is the family. They all stick together. They may squabble, but they pull for one another and live under one roof, which is really tribal, and it's not true anymore! And I think deep down, everyone misses that.When Bel Geddes agreed to return to the role for the 1985–86 season, Reed was abruptly fired. Reed failed in attempts to stop the 1985–86 season from going into production while she tried to get reinstated in the role of Miss Ellie. She sued for breach of contract, later settling out of court for over $1 million.

Personal life 

From 1943 to 1945, Reed was married to make-up artist William Tuttle. After they divorced in 1945 she married producer Tony Owen. They raised four children together: Penny Jane, Anthony, Timothy, and Mary Anne (the two older children were adopted). After 26 years of marriage, Reed and Owen divorced in 1971.

Three years later, Reed married Grover W. Asmus (1926–2003), a retired United States Army colonel. They remained married until her death in 1986.

Political views 
Reed, who was a registered Republican, but showed amity to the Democratic Party, became interested in politics in particular during the Vietnam War when she became concerned that her oldest son, Tony, might be drafted. In 1967, Reed became a peace activist and co-chaired the anti-war advocacy group, Another Mother for Peace. The group's slogan was "War is not healthy for children and other living things." In a 1971 interview with the Los Angeles Times, Reed said,
In the beginning, we felt [Tony] should serve his country in a noncombatant role. But he wouldn't even accept that, feeling the whole thing was immoral. He didn't trust the government or the military. I've learned a lot from Tony.

Reed supported Barry Goldwater in the 1964 United States presidential election.

In addition to opposing the Vietnam War, Reed also opposed nuclear power plants. She supported Democratic Senator Eugene McCarthy from Minnesota in the 1968 presidential election. He was a strong anti-war advocate.

Death 

Reed died of pancreatic cancer in Beverly Hills, California, on January 14, 1986, thirteen days before her 65th birthday. She had been diagnosed with the illness three months earlier and was told it was at a terminal stage. Her remains are interred in the Westwood Village Memorial Park Cemetery in Los Angeles.

Legacy 
In 1987, Grover Asmus (Reed's widower), actresses Shelley Fabares and Norma Connolly, and numerous friends, associates, and family members created the Donna Reed Foundation for the Performing Arts. Based in Reed's hometown of Denison, the non-profit organization grants scholarships for performing arts students, runs an annual festival of performing arts workshops, and operates the Donna Reed Center for the Performing Arts.

Denison hosts an annual Donna Reed Festival. Reed's childhood home was located on Donna Reed Drive in Denison but was destroyed by a fire in 1983. Reed's Academy Award is on display at the W. A. McHenry Museum in Denison.

In May 2010, Turner Classic Movies honored Reed as their star of the month which saw Mary Owen pay a special tribute to her mother.

In a 2011 article, actress Shelley Fabares (who played Mary Stone on The Donna Reed Show) wrote,
[Donna Reed] definitely became my second mother. She was a role model and remains so to this day. I still periodically hear her voice in my head when I am making a decision about doing something, I hear her urging me on to make the stronger decision of the two. I just adored her.Fabares also described Reed as "a real Iowa girl. There is a bedrock decency to people in the Midwest. They are thoughtful and ready to help you if something needs to be done. She never lost that Midwest girl."

Radio

Filmography

Film

Television

Awards and nominations

References

Citations

Sources

External links 

 
 
 
 
 Donna Reed TCM Star of the Month May 2010
 The Donna Reed Foundation for the Performing Arts
 The Donna Reed Show
 Photographs and literature

1921 births
1986 deaths
20th-century American actresses
Actresses from Iowa
American anti–nuclear power activists
American anti–Vietnam War activists
American anti-war activists
American film actresses
Methodists from Iowa
American radio actresses
American television actresses
Best Musical or Comedy Actress Golden Globe (television) winners
Best Supporting Actress Academy Award winners
Burials at Westwood Village Memorial Park Cemetery
California Republicans
Deaths from cancer in California
Deaths from pancreatic cancer
Los Angeles City College alumni
Metro-Goldwyn-Mayer contract players
Non-interventionism
People from Denison, Iowa
Iowa Women's Hall of Fame Inductees
American women comedians
Comedians from Iowa